Charles Lee Yeh-kwong, GBM, GBS, OBE, JP (born 16 July 1936, in Shanghai, China) was a non-official member of the Executive Council of Hong Kong and the Chairman of Hong Kong Exchanges and Clearing Limited.

After graduating from the University of London with a master's degree in law, Lee became a qualified solicitor in both Hong Kong and the United Kingdom. He is also a qualified accountant and a chartered secretary.

References

External links
 Charles LEE Yeh-kwong (archived) on Executive Council of Hong Kong website

1936 births
Living people
Alumni of the University of London
Officers of the Order of the British Empire
Politicians from Shanghai
Hong Kong financial businesspeople
Recipients of the Gold Bauhinia Star
Recipients of the Grand Bauhinia Medal
Solicitors of Hong Kong
Businesspeople from Shanghai
Members of the Executive Council of Hong Kong
Hong Kong Affairs Advisors
Members of the Selection Committee of Hong Kong